First impeachment may refer to:

 First impeachment of Donald Trump
 First impeachment process against Martín Vizcarra
 First impeachment process against Pedro Pablo Kuczynski